HMCS Sarnia was a  that served in the Royal Canadian Navy during the Second World War. She saw action in the Battle of the Atlantic and the Battle of the St. Lawrence. She was named for Sarnia, Ontario. After the war she was refitted and transferred to the Turkish Naval Forces and renamed Büyükdere. She served with them until 1972.

Design and description
They came in two versions powered by different engines; those with a diesel engines and those with vertical triple-expansion steam engines. Sarnia was of the latter design and was larger than her diesel-engined cousins. She had a complement of 6 officers and 77 enlisted.

Sarnia had two vertical triple-expansion steam engines, each driving one shaft, using steam provided by two Admiralty three-drum boilers.

Sarnia was armed with a single quick-firing (QF)  20 cwt gun mounted forward. The ship was also fitted with a QF 2-pounder Mark VIII aft and was eventually fitted with single-mounted QF 20 mm Oerlikon guns on the bridge wings. Those ships assigned to convoy duty had two depth charge launchers and four chutes to deploy the 40 depth charges they carried. Sarnia was equipped with LL and SA minesweeping gear to clear both magnetic and acoustic naval mines.

Service history
Sarnia was ordered as part of the Royal Canadian Navy's 1941–42 shipbuilding programme. The minesweeper's keel was laid down on 18 September 1941 by Davie Shipbuilding and Repairing Co. Ltd. at Lauzon, Quebec. The ship was launched on 21 January 1942 and commissioned into the Royal Canadian Navy at Toronto on 13 August 1942.

After commissioning, Sarnia escorted a Quebec-Sydney convoy en route to Halifax. She was then assigned to Newfoundland Force and remained with the unit until September 1944. That September she underwent a major refit at Lunenburg. In late 1943, the ship was involved in two sabotage events. The investigation pointed to three engine room crew members but there was not enough evidence to press charges.

After returning to service and working up in Bermuda, Sarnia was assigned to Halifax Force and then Halifax Local Defence Force, remaining with this group until June 1945. On 15 April 1945, she rescued survivors from the torpedoed , which had been waiting for Sarnia in the Halifax Approaches. Sarnia unsuccessfully depth charged Esquimalts attacker, after making contact with the submarine. After June she performed miscellaneous duties along the east coast until paid off on 28 October 1945 at Sydney and laid up at Shelburne.

Cold War service
Following the war, Sarnia was placed in strategic reserve at Sorel, Quebec. She was reacquired by the Royal Canadian Navy in 1951 and refitted. Her pennant number was changed to 190. Sarnia was the first Bangor-class minesweeper to finish her refit and was towed to Sydney, Nova Scotia and placed back in reserve. She was not recommissioned and was instead transferred to Turkey on 29 March 1958 and renamed Büyükdere. She served until 1972 when her registry was deleted. The ship was broken up in Turkey in 1972.

See also
 List of ships of the Canadian Navy

References

Notes

Citations

Sources

External links
 Haze Gray and Underway
 ReadyAyeReady.com

Bangor-class minesweepers of the Royal Canadian Navy
Ships built in Quebec
1942 ships
World War II minesweepers of Canada